Weinmann is a German surname meaning "vine man" and may refer to:

 Ariel Weinmann, U.S. Navy Seaman Recruit guilty of espionage and desertion
 Johann Anton Weinmann (1782–1858), German botanist and mycologist
 Johann Wilhelm Weinmann (1683–1741), German apothecary and botanist
 Markus Weinmann (born 1974), German agricultural scientist

See also 
 Weinmannia
 Weinman

References 

German-language surnames
Jewish surnames